Scripting for the Java Platform is a framework for embedding scripts into Java source code.  

There is no requirement for a given Java virtual machine (JVM) to include any engines by default, but the Oracle JVM (Java 6 and later) includes a JavaScript engine, based on Rhino version 1.6R2 before Java 8, and Nashorn since Java 8. 

Scripting for the Java Platform was developed under the Java Community Process as JSR 223. The final release of JSR 223 happened on December 11, 2006. The specification, however, was withdrawn later on December 13, 2016 after a Maintenance Review Ballot, where it was decided that this functionality would be included as an integral part of Java 9 and onward.

See also 
 Da Vinci Machine
 Groovy
 List of JVM languages
 Apache JMeter

References

Bibliography

External links 
 JSR 223: Scripting for the Java Platform Specification Request
 
 
 
 Java Scripting Programmer's Guide for Java SE 14 at Oracle

Java specification requests